Arantxa Sánchez Vicario and Natasha Zvereva were the defending champions but lost in the final 6–2, 3–6, 6–3 against Martina Hingis and Jana Novotná.

Seeds
Champion seeds are indicated in bold text while text in italics indicates the round in which those seeds were eliminated. All sixteen seeded teams received byes into the second round.

Draw

Finals

Top half

Section 1

Section 2

Bottom half

Section 3

Section 4

External links
 1998 Lipton Championships Women's Doubles Draw

Women's Doubles
Lipton Championships - Women's Doubles